Egulbati is a locality located in the municipality of Valle de Egüés, in Navarre province, Spain. Since 1960, it has not been populated.

Geography 
Egulbati is located 14km east-northeast of Pamplona.

References

Populated places in Navarre